Mayron Antonio George Clayton (born 23 October 1993) is a Costa Rican professional footballer who plays for French  club Pau.

Career
On 3 August 2019, it was confirmed, that George had been loaned out from Midtjylland to Norwegian club Vålerenga for the rest of 2019. On 15 January 2020, he was loaned out again, this time to Hungarian club Budapest Honvéd FC until June 2020.

In June 2022, George returned to Pau.

Career statistics

Club

International goals
Scores and results list Costa Rica's goal tally first, score column indicates score after each George goal.

References

External links
 

1993 births
Living people
Costa Rican footballers
Association football forwards
Costa Rica international footballers
2019 CONCACAF Gold Cup players
People from Limón Province
OFI Crete F.C. players
Hobro IK players
Randers FC players
Lyngby Boldklub players
FC Midtjylland players
Vålerenga Fotball players
Budapest Honvéd FC players
Kalmar FF players
Pau FC players
FC Lausanne-Sport players
Liga FPD players
Danish Superliga players
Danish 1st Division players
Super League Greece players
Eliteserien players
Allsvenskan players
Nemzeti Bajnokság I players
Ligue 2 players
Costa Rican expatriate footballers
Expatriate footballers in Greece
Expatriate men's footballers in Denmark
Expatriate footballers in Norway
Expatriate footballers in Hungary
Expatriate footballers in Sweden
Expatriate footballers in France
Expatriate footballers in Switzerland
Costa Rican expatriate sportspeople in Greece
Costa Rican expatriate sportspeople in Denmark
Costa Rican expatriate sportspeople in Norway
Costa Rican expatriate sportspeople in Hungary
Costa Rican expatriate sportspeople in Sweden
Costa Rican expatriate sportspeople in France
Costa Rican expatriate sportspeople in Switzerland